Hans Straberg is the Chairman of Atlas Copco and SKF. He was the President & CEO of Electrolux AB from 2002 to 2010. Straberg is also a Bilderberg participant.

Hans Stråberg, born in 1957 in Västervik, is a Swedish business leader. He was one of the youngest CEOs of a Fortune Global 500 companies.

Education 
Stråberg holds a Master of Science, Mechanical Engineering, Chalmers University of Technology, in 1981.

He is a reserve officer in the Swedish Army

Professional life
Stråberg joined Electrolux in 1983 and moved to a senior management position in 1987. Between 1983 and 2002, he held several management positions at Electrolux in Sweden and United States.

After finishing his studies, Hans Stråberg became assistant to the Swedish technical attaché in Washington, D.C., 1981-1983. Stråberg joined Electrolux in 1983. He had various positions within the company and in 1987 he got his first managerial position as a global responsibility for dishwashers and washing machines. In 1992, he became plant manager at the vacuum cleaner factory in Västervik. Stråberg moved in 1995 to the United States with responsibility for the Group's appliance development and production in North America. With his team he introduced a front-loading washers in the United States, a product which in 2010 had a market share of 12 percent. In 1998, he came into the Group Management as vice president and head of Electrolux vacuum cleaner business and small appliances products of the company. During his time as head of Electrolux vacuum cleaner business his team developed the world's first automatic vacuum cleaner, the Trilobite. In 2001 he became Chief Operating Officer of Electrolux and appointed to take over the CEO post in 2002. He succeeded Michael Treschow. Stråberg was President and CEO of AB Electrolux 2002-2011. He was one of the youngest CEOs of a Fortune Global 500 companies.

Directorships 
Stråberg is chairman of Atlas Copco AB, AB SKF, Roxtec AB and CTEK AB. He is a Director of Investor AB, Stora Enso Oyj, Mellby Gård AB and Anocca.

He is a former chairman of Orchid Ortopedics, Nikkarit Oy and Vice Preses of the Royal Swedish Academy of Engineering Sciences. Stråberg was European Co-chair of TABD, the Transatlantic Business Dialogue, 2013-2014. He was previously a board member of the Confederation of Swedish Enterprise, Vice President of the Confederation of Engineering Industries and Nederman AB.

Furthermore, he has been instrumental in the start-up of the non-profit organization SIFE in Sweden in 2004 and its chairman since its inception and in subsequent entrepreneurial organization Business Challenge SBC.

Awards 
Commander in the Order of Leopold II, HM the King of Belgium (2006)

H.M. King of Sweden Gold Medal of 12th size in serafimerorderns tape (2015)

Member of the Royal Swedish Academy of Engineering Sciences (2006).

Lucia Trade Award, the Swedish-American Chamber of Commerce, New York (2016).

Chair of the Year Sweden 2016.

Gustaf Dalén medal, Chalmers University of Technology

Golden Gavel 2019 (Atlas Copco) from the Swedish Academy for Board Directors

Family 
Hans Stråberg was born in Västervik, Sweden.

He is married to Elizabeth and has two children.

References

Living people
1957 births